Henry Vernon (by 1523 – 29 September 1569), of Sudbury, Derbyshire, was an English politician.

He was a Member (MP) of the Parliament of England for Lichfield in April 1554 and for Derbyshire in November 1554.

References

1523 births
1569 deaths
People from Sudbury, Derbyshire
English MPs 1554
English MPs 1554–1555